Man of Iron is a 1981 film directed by Andrzej Wajda. It depicts the Solidarity labour movement and its first success in persuading the Polish government to recognize the workers' right to an independent union.

The film continues the story of Maciej Tomczyk, the son of Mateusz Birkut, the protagonist of Wajda's earlier film, Man of Marble. Here, Maciej is a young worker involved in the anti-Communist labour movement, described as "the man who started the Gdańsk Shipyard strike", and a journalist working for the Communist regime's radio station, who is given a task of slandering Maciej. The young man is clearly intended as a parallel to Lech Wałęsa (who appears as himself in the movie).

Man of Iron clarifies the ending of Man of Marble, which left the death of Mateusz Birkut ambiguous. Man of Iron explicitly states that Mateusz was killed in clashes at the shipyards in 1970.

The film was made during the brief thaw in Communist censorship that appeared between the formation of Solidarity in August 1980 and its suppression in December 1981, and as such it is remarkably critical of the Communist regime. Because of this it was banned in 1981 by the Polish government. The film won the Palme d'Or and the Prize of the Ecumenical Jury at the 1981 Cannes Film Festival. It was also nominated for the Academy Award for Best Foreign Language Film.

Plot
Activist Maciek Tomczyk, the son of Man of Marble's hero Mateusz Birkut, is leading a shipyard strike in Gdańsk against the Communist authorities. A radio named journalist Winkel is ordered by the deputy chairman of the Radio Committee to investigate Tomczyk and find compromising information about him. Winkel is sent to Gdańsk, where he is monitored by the authorities.

The strikers refuse to give Winkel access to the shipyard, but he meets a friend, Dzidek. Dzidek knew Tomczyk in college and later recounts how Tomczyk's father, Mateusz Birkut, would not allow his son to take part in the student protests in March 1968. From another source, Tomczyk learns that Birkut himself died during protests in December 1970. Winkel becomes increasingly sympathetic to the strikers' cause, but continues his investigation under pressure from the authorities.  

After his father's death, Tomczyk had married Agnieszka, who he had met when was making a documentary about Birkut's career as a well-publicized Stakhanovite worker hero. Winkel visits Agnes, who is now in police custody for her support of the strike. Agnes describes her romance and marriage with Tomczyk and their fight for workers' rights. 

Despite being blackmailed by the secret police for a drunk driving accident in his past, Winkel ultimately eventually refuses to complete his assignment and resigns from his job. He is admitted to the shipyard, where he joins the strikers. A government delegation reaches an agreement with Lech Wałęsa and the other strikers, and Agnes tearfully reunites with Tomczyk during the announcement. A government official warns that the agreement is "only a piece of paper," but Tomczyk tells his father's memorial that the strikers have "made it through the worst."

Cast
 Jerzy Radziwiłowicz - Maciej Tomczyk / Mateusz Birkut
 Krystyna Janda - Agnieszka
 Marian Opania - Winkel
 Irena Byrska - Mother Hulewicz
 Wiesława Kosmalska - Wiesława Hulewicz
 Bogusław Linda - Dzidek
 Franciszek Trzeciak - Badecki
 Janusz Gajos - deputy chairman of Radio Committee
 Andrzej Seweryn - Capt. Wirski
 Marek Kondrat - Grzenda
 Jan Tesarz - Szef
 Jerzy Trela - Antoniak
 Krzysztof Janczar - Kryska
 Krystyna Zachwatowicz - Hanka Tomczyk
 Bogusław Sobczuk - Redaktor TVP
 Lech Wałęsa - Himself
 Anna Walentynowicz - Herself

See also
 List of submissions to the 54th Academy Awards for Best Foreign Language Film
 List of Polish submissions for the Academy Award for Best Foreign Language Film

References

External links

1981 films
Films directed by Andrzej Wajda
Palme d'Or winners
1980s Polish-language films
Films about the labor movement
1981 drama films
Films set in Poland
Lech Wałęsa
Cultural depictions of Lech Wałęsa
Films critical of communism
Films set in 1980
Polish drama films